The discography of Shouta Aoi consists of three studio albums, one mini-album, two compilation albums, and seventeen singles. In addition to this, Aoi has released music and drama CDs for characters he has voiced as well as contributing to anime and video game soundtracks.

Aoi debuted as a singer in 2006 with the song "Negaiboshi" and used the stage name Showta until 2009. Afterwards, he began releasing music independently under the pseudonym Noboru Ryugaki. Once he made his voice acting debut in 2011, he restarted his music career and later began releasing songs under the stage name Shouta Aoi, with his current music career separate from his previous. Since 2011, Aoi's music has been primarily produced by Elements Garden with his oversight.

Albums

Studio albums

Extended plays

Compilation albums

Singles

Soundtrack

Guest appearances

Character singles

Participating singles

Character albums

Other songs

Videography

Music videos

Notes

References

Discographies of Japanese artists